The Filthiest Hits...So Far is the first compilation album by Israeli dubstep artist Borgore, released on July 26, 2011, through Sumerian Records. It is Borgore's first release on Sumerian Records and serves as a greatest hits collection with tracks from all of Borgore's previous releases.

Track listing

Personnel
Borgore - lead vocals, production, programming
Diplo - programming on "Sunsets"
Adi Ulmansky - vocals on "Someone Else's" and "Broken Rulez"
Shay Grayevsky - vocals on "Nympho" and "Glory Hole"
16 Bit - remix on "Foes"
Asking Alexandria - original band performance on "Final Episode" (Borgore's Die Bitch Remix)
Yoni Sharoni-Vocals on "Act Like a Ho!"

References

2011 compilation albums
Borgore albums
Sumerian Records albums